Knyvett Crosse  (born 1855) was a Welsh international footballer. He was part of the Wales national football team between 1879 and 1881, playing 3 matches and scoring 1 goal. He played his first match on 7 April 1879 against Scotland and his last match on 14 March 1881 against Scotland.

Football career
Crosse played for Ruabon in 1878.

He played as a Centre for Druids for 6 years and won the Welsh Cup three times.

Later career

After football he became the proprietor of the Star Hotel, High Street, Bangor.

Whilst living in Bangor he was the captain of Bangor Cricket Club.

See also
 List of Wales international footballers (alphabetical)

References

1855 births
Welsh footballers
Wales international footballers
People from Shropshire
Place of birth missing
Date of death missing
Association football forwards